The Highways Act 1555 (2 & 3 Ph. & Mary, c. 8), sometimes the First Statute of Highways, was an Act of the Parliament of England, which placed the burden of upkeep of the highways on individual parishes and that was passed in 1555. The Act was amended, and extended, by the Highways Act 1562.

The Act
The Act provided that each year, in the Easter week, every parish was to elect "two honest persons" of the parish to serve as the Surveyor of Highways, who would be responsible for the upkeep of those highways within the parish boundaries which ran to market towns.

The Surveyors would announce, on the first Sunday after Easter and four days before 24 June, on which the maintenance work was to be carried out, and for these four days the whole parish was to work on the highways.

Every person, for every ploughland they held in the parish, and every other person keeping a draught team or plough there, was to provide a cart or wain equipped for the work, and two able-bodied men, on a penalty of 10s per draught; the Surveyors could, at their discretion, require a further two men instead of the cart. Every other householder, as well as every other cottager and labourer free to labour, was to send themselves or a substitute able-bodied labourer to work for the four days, on a penalty of 12d per day apiece. All labourers were to provide their own equipment, and bound to work for eight hours each day upon the roads.

Amendments 
The Act was originally in force for seven years, but its provisions were extended to run for another twenty years by the Highways Act 1562. It was repealed by section 57 of the Highways Act 1766 (7 Geo. 3. c. 42).

References

Citations

Notes

Bibliography

1555 in law
1555 in England
Acts of the Parliament of England (1485–1603)
Roads in England
Transport policy in the United Kingdom
Transport legislation
History of transport in England